Herbert Johnson may refer to:

 Herbert Fisk Johnson Sr. (1868–1928), 2nd generation business magnate (S.C. Johnson & Son)
 Herbert Johnson (cartoonist) (1878–1946), American cartoonist
 Herb Johnson (footballer) (1879–1942), Australian footballer for Collingwood
 Herbert Victor Johnson (1889–1962), Australian politician
 Herbert Fisk Johnson Jr. (1899–1978), 3rd generation business magnate (S.C. Johnson & Son)
 Herbert Fisk Johnson III (born 1958), 5th generation business magnate (S.C. Johnson & Son)
 Herb Johnson (American football) (born 1928), American football halfback
 Herb Johnson (basketball) (born 1962), professional basketball player
Herbert Thomas Johnson, military officer in Vermont
 Herbert Johnson (hatters), London hatters

See also
Bert Johnson (disambiguation)